The Secrets of Atlantis: The Sacred Legacy is a 2006 graphic adventure game developed by the French studio Atlantis Interactive Entertainment and published by Nobilis. It is the fifth and latest game in the Atlantis series started by Cryo, and the second one made by Atlantis Interactive Entertainment, following Atlantis Evolution.

Gameplay
The gameplay is similar the other Atlantis games. The player moves around in a first person view, similar to Myst or Ages.

Story
In 1937, Howard Brooks, a young aeronautical engineer, returns from a conference in Germany.
On board the Hindenburg zeppelin taking him to New York, Howard is attacked by members of an occult sect.

When Howard wakes up in the Hindenburg he finds himself alone. Eventually he meets a man claiming to have followed him for a long time, and that he and Howard are the last ones left on the zeppelin.

He soon learns that these evildoers covet the mysterious secret of a forgotten civilization of which, it seems, he is the heir. Convinced that Howard has a key element of their research, they decide to set a trap for him.

Caught up by his past, Howard sets out on an adventure that leads him, by turns, to several locations: Macao, an Indian palace, a temple in Mesopotamia and the Empire State Building in New York.

Reception

The Secrets of Atlantis received "generally unfavorable reviews" from critics, according to Metacritic.

References

2006 video games
Atlantis in fiction
Atlantis (video game series)
First-person adventure games
IOS games
MacOS games
Video game sequels
Video games developed in France
Windows games
Fiction set in 1937
The Adventure Company games
Video games set in the 1930s
Video games set in the Arctic
Video games set in India
Video games set in Iraq
Video games set in Macau
Video games set in New York City
Point-and-click adventure games